Arrington High (1910 - 1988) was an American journalist and newspaper publisher. He published the Eagle Eye newspaper in Jackson, Mississippi and was an advocate for African American civil rights.

Biography 
Arrington High was born in 1910 to an African American mother and a Euro-American father. He published the Eagle Eye newspaper in Jackson, Mississippi. High wrote and published the Eagle Eye from his own home, located on Maple Street in Jackson. Copies of the newspaper were sold for ten cents and were available for purchase directly from High or from the Farish Street Newsstand. High was known for being a strong, outspoken advocated for social equality and civil rights. The banner of Eagle Eye read, "America's greatest newspaper, bombarding segregation and discrimination."

High was fined for publishing criticism of school segregation. He was surveilled by the Mississippi Sovereignty Commission. He was arrested for selling literature without a permit. After publishing criticism of segregationists, he was held in the Mississippi State Asylum in Whitfield until he escaped to Chicago. He reported escaping in a casket. He made allegations against a brothel he said employed African Americans to serve white clients. He continued publishing his newssheet from Chicago. He promoted conspiracy theories in his later publishing career. He died while living with his daughter in Chicago.

Further reading
 Jackson Eagle Eye (September 1954–May 1967) in Jet magazine May 16, 1988

References

1910 births
1988 deaths
Activists for African-American civil rights
Writers from Jackson, Mississippi
Writers from Chicago
20th-century American journalists
American male journalists